Antonio Voltolino or Voltolini (1643–1718) was an Italian painter of the Baroque style.

Biography
He studied with Biagio Falcieri in Verona. He painted in the Sacristy of San Bernardino, Verona. His pupils included Giovanni Battista Belloti (1667-1730), Giovanni Battista Canziani (died 1730),  Antonio Corte, Giovanni Battista Lanceni (1659-1735), and Odoardo Perini (1671-1757).

References

1643 births
1718 deaths
17th-century Italian painters
Italian male painters
18th-century Italian painters
Italian Baroque painters
Painters from Verona
18th-century Italian male artists